Hubertus is a former unincorporated community and now neighborhood in the village of Richfield in Washington County, Wisconsin, United States.
The community was named after the previous parish St. Hubert's (now joined with St. Gabriel).

Education
Crown of Life Lutheran School is a 3K-8 grade school of the Wisconsin Evangelical Lutheran Synod in Hubertus.

Visitor attractions
Holy Hill Shrine is located in the area.

See also
Kettle Moraine Scenic Drive

Notes

External links 
 Hubertus, Wisconsin, Dictionary of Wisconsin History

Unincorporated communities in Washington County, Wisconsin
Unincorporated communities in Wisconsin
Neighborhoods in Wisconsin